Tassin is a French name:

Surname 
 André Tassin (1902–1986), French footballer
 Augustus Gabriel de Vivier Tassin (1842–1893), French-born American soldier in the American Civil War
 Christophe Tassin (died 1660), French cartographer
 Eloi Tassin (1912–1977), French professional bicycle racer
 René-Prosper Tassin (1697–1777), French historian
 Thierry Tassin (born 1959), Belgian racing driver

Other 
 Tassin-la-Demi-Lune, a French commune in Auvergne-Rhône-Alpes